Reineke is a surname. It may refer to:

Bill Reineke (born 1954), member of the Ohio House of Representatives
Blanche Reineke (1863–1935), American portrait photographer
Chad Reineke (born 1982), American baseball pitcher
Gary Reineke, Canadian actor
Steven Reineke (born 1970), American musical composer and conductor
Theresa M. Reineke (born 1972), American professor of chemistry

See also
 Reinecke (disambiguation)

Surnames from given names